This is a list of country codes used by GS1.

Source: GS1 Company Prefix

Note GS1 member companies can manufacture products anywhere in the world and can license prefixes from the GS1 organisation of their choice, GS1 prefixes do not identify the country of origin for a given product.
GS1 prefixes not listed above are reserved by GS1 Global Office for allocations in countries where these is no GS1 Member Organisation and for future use within the GS1 system. These are:

 140–199
 381, 382, 384, 386 & 388
 390–399
 441–449
 472 & 473
 510–519
 522–527
 532–534 & 536–538
 550–559
 561–568
 580–589
 591–593 & 595–598
 602 & 605–606
 610, 612 & 614
 632–639
 650–689
 710–728
 747–749
 751–753 & 756–758
 772, 774 & 776
 781–783, 785, 787 & 788
 791–799
 851–857
 861–864 & 866
 881, 882, 886, 887 & 889
 891, 892, 894, 895, 897 & 898
 920–929
 953, 954, 956, 957 & 959
 970–976
 984–989

References

External links
 List of Assigned GS1 Prefixes
 Snopes article regarding barcodes
GS1
Lists of country codes